Junjie may refer to:

 Gu Junjie (born 1985), Chinese triple jumper
 JJ Lin (Lin Junjie, born 1981), a Singaporean singer-songwriter and actor based in Taiwan
 Qin Junjie (born 1991), Chinese actor
 Brilliance BS4, a car, also known as Zhonghua Junjie
 Junjie Xu, the model for Po from Kung Fu Panda: Legends of Awesomeness

See also 
 Junji